Jeene Nahi Doonga is a 1984 Bollywood action film directed by Rajkumar Kohli. The film stars Dharmendra, Shatrughan Sinha, Raj Babbar, Anita Raj, Roshni in lead roles. Its plot bears resemblance to the Pakistani Punjabi movie Maula Jatt.

Cast
Dharmendra as Roshan / Raka (Double Role)
Shatrughan Sinha as Shaka
Raj Babbar as Badal
Anita Raj as Bijli 
Roshni as Reshma
Shakti Kapoor as Shakti Singh
Raza Murad as Jabbar
Vinod Mehra as Police Inspector
Parikshit Sahni as Fakeer Baba
Jagdeep as Jhumru
Jayshree T. as Jayshree
Jagdish Raj as Jailor
Neeta Mehta as Chandni
Leena Das as Dancer
Mehar Mittal as Ghasitaram
Kader Khan as Narrator

Plot
Bitter animosity and hatred has existed between the communities of Jangavar and Dilavar. While Dilavar's Roshan wants to bring peace between everyone, he sets an example by marrying Chandni. This enrages the Jangavars' who attack the Dilavars, killing Roshan. Before dying, Roshan asks his twin brother, Raka, to promise that he will bring peace by getting their brother, Badal, married to Shaka's sister, Reshma. Raka attempts to carry out his promise, by letting both meet and fall in love with each other. When the time comes for Badal to propose to Reshma, she accepts with one condition - that Badal kill Raka and bring his severed head to Jangavar. The question is will Badal sacrifice his brother's life to marry Reshma and bring peace between the two communities?

Soundtrack

References

External links
 

1984 films
1980s Hindi-language films
Films scored by Laxmikant–Pyarelal
Hindi remakes of Punjabi films
Indian remakes of Pakistani films